Thermidor was the eleventh month in the French Republican Calendar. The month was named after the French word thermal, derived from the Greek word "thermos" (heat).

Thermidor was the second month of the summer quarter (mois d'été). It started July 19 or 20. It ended August 17 or 18. It follows the Messidor and precedes the Fructidor. During Year 2, it was sometimes called Fervidor.

Because of the Thermidorian Reaction—9 Thermidor Year II—the overthrow of revolutionary radical Maximilien Robespierre and his followers in that month, the word "Thermidor" has come to mean a retreat from more radical goals and strategies during a revolution, especially when caused by a replacement of leading personalities.

Day name table 
Like all French Republican Calendar months, Thermidor lasted 30 days and was divided into three 10-day weeks called décades (decades). Every day had the name of an agricultural plant, except the 5th (Quintidi) and 10th day (Decadi) of every decade, which had the name of a domestic animal or an agricultural tool, respectively.

Conversion table

Thermidor in revolution 

The Thermidorian Reaction, Revolution of Thermidor, or simply Thermidor refers to the coup of 9 Thermidor (27 July 1794) in which the Committee of Public Safety led by Maximilien Robespierre was sidelined and its leaders arrested and guillotined, resulting in the end of the Reign of Terror. The new regime, known as The Directory, introduced more conservative policies aimed at stabilizing the revolutionary government.

Consequently, for historians of revolutionary movements, the term Thermidor has come to mean the phase in some revolutions when the political pendulum swings back towards something resembling a pre-revolutionary state, and power slips from the hands of the original revolutionary leadership. Leon Trotsky, in his book The Revolution Betrayed, refers to the rise of Joseph Stalin and the accompanying post-revolutionary bureaucracy as the "Soviet Thermidor".

Thermidor in culture 

The food Lobster Thermidor was named, directly or indirectly, after the month. (Sometimes it is said that it was first prepared for Napoleon I during the month of Thermidor; others say that it was created by Tony Girod at the Café de Paris to celebrate the opening of a play called Thermidor.)

Thermidor is also the name of a story revolving around the end of the French Revolution in Neil Gaiman's The Sandman, issue #29.

"Thermidor" and "Thermidor 2" were lobster-like robots on Robot Wars.

A man by the name of "Thermidor" is the leader of the ORCA reactionary group in the video game Armored Core: For Answer. Additionally, in the game, ORCA launches a large-scale offensive on "13 Thermidor", as the game narration states that "for many, the chaos began in early July" (although it had been August by now).

There is a song recorded by J-pop artist Nana Mizuki by the name of "Thermidor". Its lyrics talk about a person in love that is also rethinking his or her personal feelings after realizing that the person they love has changed, and so has the person. Its lyrics mimic the modern definition of Thermidor.

The events of the Thermidorean Reaction are also referenced in an album by California punk-rock band Shinobu, which is appropriately titled "10 Thermidor", and has tracks named both "9 Thermidor" and "10 Thermidor" on the album.

External links 
 Summer Quarter of Year II (facsimile)

French Republican calendar
July
August
Maximilien Robespierre

sv:Franska revolutionskalendern#Månaderna